Bocas del Toro "Isla Colón" International Airport  is a public airport located  northwest of the center of Bocas del Toro, a town on Isla Colón (Colón Island) in the Bocas del Toro Province of Panama. The facility is also called José Ezequiel Hall International Airport.

The airport operates from 6:00 AM to 8:00 PM daily. It has a control tower and runway lights. The single runway is aligned in an east–west direction. The airport can accommodate business jets such as Bombardier Global Express, Gulfstreams, Dassault Falcon. The biggest scheduled plane is Air Panama Fokker 50. International arrivals must clear Panamanian customs at the airport.

Airlines and destinations

Weather
Bocas del Toro is a tropical coastal destination. The climate is hot and humid. Unlike most of Panama, Bocas does not have a clear wet and dry season. Thunderstorms occur year-round, which will delay flights. Bocas receives large amounts of precipitation.

See also
Transport in Panama
List of airports in Panama

References

External links
 BocasDelToro.com OFFICIAL WEBSITE - Everything about Bocas del Toro
 

Airports in Panama
Buildings and structures in Bocas del Toro Province